The 2010 SEC women's basketball tournament was the championship tournament of the Southeastern Conference in the 2009–10 NCAA Division I women's basketball season. The winner of the tournament earned the SEC's automatic bid to the 2010 NCAA tournament. It was held at the Arena at Gwinnett Center in the Atlanta suburb of Duluth, Georgia from March 4 to March 7. The first round and quarterfinals were televised by Fox Sports South, the semifinals were aired by ESPNU, and the final aired on ESPN2.

The regular-season champion, Tennessee, won the tournament, which was believed at the time to have secured a #1 seed in the NCAA Tournament (which proved true).

Seeds 

All SEC schools played in the tournament. Teams were seeded by 2009–10 SEC season record, with a tiebreaker system to seed teams with identical conference records. Unlike men's basketball play, SEC women's play is not conducted in a divisional format; all 12 teams are organized in a single table. The top four teams in the regular-season standings received byes.

Schedule

2010 SEC tournament

References 

SEC women's basketball tournament
2009–10 Southeastern Conference women's basketball season
2010 in sports in Georgia (U.S. state)